The Evangelical-Reformed Church of the Canton Basel-Landschaft is a Reformed cantonal church in the canton of Basel-Land, which does not include the eponymous city. In 2004 it had 113,537 members and 35 parishes and 65 ordained clergy. Member of the Schweizerischer Evangelischer Kirchenbund. Women ordination is allowed.

External links 
Evangelical Reformed Church in the Canton of Basel

References 

Basel-Landschaft
Basel Land
Basel Land